New World Rage Music is the sixth release by industrial metal band Red Harvest. It was released in 2001.

Track listing

External links

 Red Harvest's official website

 

Red Harvest (band) albums